, also known as , was an empress consort of Emperor Go-Suzaku of Japan.  She was the second cousin of her husband.

Life
She was the third daughter of Emperor Sanjō and the mother of Emperor Go-Sanjō.  In 1023, she had her coming of age ceremony, and was elevated to the title of First Princess.  In 1027, she married her second cousin, the Crown Prince.

Empress
In 1036, when her husband became Emperor, she was made his Secondary Empress, and promoted to Principal Empress the following year. 
In 1037, however, Fujiwara no Genshi, daughter of Fujiwara no Yorimichi, was made Secondary Empress and became the Emperors favorite, and Teishi was no longer allowed to enter the Inner Imperial Palace.  This soured relations between Teishi and Yorimichi.  In 1039, Geishi died, and Teishi was allowed back to the Imperial Palace.

Later life
In 1045, her husband died. Teishi was given the title Grand Empress in 1052, and Senior Grand Empress in 1068.

In 1069, her son succeeded to the throne, and Teishi retired from court and became a nun under the name Yōmeimon-in. 

Issue

 Imperial Prince Takahito (尊仁親王) (Emperor Go-Sanjō) (1034–1073)
 Imperial Princess Nagako/Ryōshi (良子内親王) (1029–1077) - Saiō at Ise Shrine 1036–1045 (Ippon-Jusangū, 一品准三宮)
 Imperial Princess Kenshi (娟子内親王) (1032–1103) - Saiin at Kamo Shrine 1036–1045, and later married to Minamoto no Toshifusa (源俊房)

Notes

Japanese princesses
Japanese empresses
Japanese Buddhist nuns
11th-century Buddhist nuns
1013 births
1094 deaths
Daughters of emperors